Mesves-sur-Loire (literally Mesves on Loire) is a commune in the Nièvre department in central France.

Geography
Mesves-sur-Loire is a farm town on the right bank of the river Loire, surrounded by grain fields to the east and vineyards to the north and south. The vineyards are within the Pouilly Fumé district, the famous wine town of Pouilly-sur-Loire being located just 5 km to the north.  The general area is known as La Nièvre and lies within the larger region known as Bourgogne-Franche-Comté.

Mesves-Bulcy station has rail connections to Nevers and Cosne-sur-Loire.  There is also a new highway, A77 autoroute, which parallels the rail line and runs to the outskirts of Paris.  So, while Mesves is quiet, it is easily accessible from Paris.

History
In 1918, during World War I, a field between the towns of Mesves-sur-Loire and Bulcy was the site of a huge American Army hospital.  In November, 1918, there were 20,186 patients and a total of 38,765 wounded and convalescing soldiers spent time at this temporary hospital.    As many as 140,000 Americans were stationed in the area in 1918 so the it had a major American presence.

This site, close to the river Loire, was one of two huge American Army hospitals during World War I (the other being in Mars-sur-Allier).  It was selected because it was a safe distance from the battle lines in northeast France (Mesves is about 200 km south of Paris); further, it is located on a major rail line to Paris, making it accessible).

When entering Bulcy, just 3 km to the east of Mesves, the street sign identifies the street name as rue du Camp-Américain.  That is the only visible signage reminding one of the huge US Army hospital that served so many wounded service men during World War I.  The fields have been totally restored and are full of crops during the growing season.

Demographics
On 1 January 2019, the estimated population was 667.

See also
Communes of the Nièvre department

References

Communes of Nièvre